Table tennis competitions at the 2023 Pan American Games in Santiago, Chile are scheduled to be held October August 29 and November 5, 2023 at the Olympic Training Center located at Ñuñoa.

Seven medal events are scheduled to be contested, two singles events, three doubles events and two team events.

Qualification system

A total of 88 athletes will qualify to compete (44 men and 44 women). Each nation may enter a maximum of 6 athletes (three per gender). In each gender there will be a total of 12 teams qualified, with one team per event reserved for the host nation Chile. Six places will be allocated for singles events (by gender) to athletes that have obtained the best results at the qualification tournament for singles events of the Pan American Games. Athletes qualified through various qualifying events.

The top two teams (for men and women) at the 2022 Pan American Championships, the top two teams (not already qualified) from the Caribbean, Central America, South America and the top team from North America, and the two best teams from the Special qualification event will each qualify a team. As stated earlier, Chile also qualified a team in each event. The last 6 spots will be awarded to individuals, with a maximum of two per nation.

Participating nations
A total of 5 countries qualified athletes so far.

Medal summary

Medalists

References

Events at the 2023 Pan American Games
2023 
2023 Pan American Games